James Sherriffs or Shirreffs (1752–1830) was a Scottish minister who served as  Moderator of the General Assembly of the Church of Scotland in 1807.

Life

He was born in Aberdeen in 1752 the son of David Sherriffs. He was educated locally then studied at Aberdeen University graduating MA in 1770.

He was initially a schoolmaster at Aberdeen Grammar School. In 1776 he was licensed to preach by the Church of Scotland and in 1779 received patronage and was ordained in St Nicholas Kirk in Aberdeen. In 1795 the university awarded him an honorary doctorate (DD) and in the same year he was appointed 11th Patron to the Seven Incorporated Trades of Aberdeen.

He lived his final years at “Friendville” in Aberdeen.
He died on 28 March 1830.

Family

On 28 September 1790 he married Amelia Morison.

Publications

An  Inquiry into the Life of Dr William Guild (1798)

References

1752 births
1830 deaths
People from Aberdeen
19th-century Ministers of the Church of Scotland
Alumni of the University of Aberdeen
Moderators of the General Assembly of the Church of Scotland
18th-century Ministers of the Church of Scotland